Crown Heights may refer to:
 Crown Heights, Brooklyn, a neighborhood of the New York City borough of Brooklyn
 Crown Heights riot, a 1991 race riot in Crown Heights Brooklyn 
 Crown Heights – Utica Avenue (IRT Eastern Parkway Line), a subway station in the neighborhood
 Crown Heights, New York, a hamlet on the west side of the town of Poughkeepsie
 Crown Heights (film), a 2017 film written and directed by Matt Ruskin